The 1952 Paris–Roubaix was the 50th edition of the Paris–Roubaix, a classic one-day cycle race in France. The single day event was held on 13 April 1952 and stretched  from Paris to the finish at Roubaix Velodrome. The winner was Rik Van Steenbergen from Belgium.

Results

References

1952
1952 in road cycling
1952 in French sport
1952 Challenge Desgrange-Colombo
April 1952 sports events in the United States